Twickenham Historic District was the first historic district designated in Huntsville, Alabama, USA. It was added to the National Register of Historic Places on January 4, 1973, with a boundary increase on May 26, 2015. The name derives from an early name for the town of Huntsville, named after Twickenham, England, by LeRoy Pope. It features homes in the Federal and Greek Revival architectural styles introduced to the city by Virginia-born architect George Steele about 1818, and contains the most dense concentration of antebellum homes in Alabama. The 1819 Weeden House Museum, home of female artist and poet Maria Howard Weeden, is open to the public, as are several others in the district.

Notable structures 
 Helion Lodge 1 — 409 Lincoln Street, original building erected 1820; current building started in 1911.  Home of a Masonic group that is the oldest in the state.

References

External links 
 American Memory's Built in America Collection which has drawings, photographs, and descriptions of old houses and buildings.
 Alabama Women's Hall of Fame: Maria Howard Weeden (1846-1905)
 Huntsville Pilgrimage Association, conducts annual tour of historic houses
 Helion Lodge #1
 

Historic districts in Huntsville, Alabama
National Register of Historic Places in Huntsville, Alabama
Greek Revival architecture in Alabama
Federal architecture in Alabama
Historic districts on the National Register of Historic Places in Alabama